This is a list of Ministers of Finance of Brazil.

Colonial Brazil and United Kingdom of Portugal, Brazil and the Algarves

Reign of John VI

Empire of Brazil

Reign of Pedro I

Regency period

Reign of Pedro II

Republican period

First Brazilian Republic

Second Brazilian Republic

Estado Novo (Third Brazilian Republic)

Fourth Brazilian Republic

Military Dictatorship (Fifth Brazilian Republic)

Sixth Brazilian Republic

References

Finance
Finance Ministers of Brazil